Stainsby, in North Yorkshire, England, is an abandoned village near the Acklam suburb of Middlesbrough and town of Thornaby. Little more than mounds near the A19 road are now visible. The site is a scheduled monument.

Stainsby Grange Farm, Stainsby Hall Farm and Stainsby Hill Farm retain the former village's name. Stainsby Beck forms part of the Stockton-on-Tees and Middlesbrough borough boundary. Nearby Acklam Grange School was formerly named Stainsby.

History
Stainsby was recorded in the Domesday Book of 1086, as being three carucates. Walter de Stainsby held the village from 1284 to 1303; from 1388 to 1566 it followed the descent of the manor of Picton; from about 1800 it was held by the Earl of Harewood.

Records of 1302 show that nine inhabitants were eligible to pay taxes. It is not known how or when the village became deserted. The earliest map of the settlement, of 1757, shows Stainsby Grange Farm as the only building.

During the Second World War, a Type 22 pillbox was built on the site, as part of the defences for Thornaby Aerodrome nearby; it is included in the scheduling of the monument. The A19 road, planned in 1969, lies immediately to the east of the site, having been routed to avoid the medieval village.

Earthworks
The earthworks lie to the south and south-east of Stainsby Grange Farm. They were surveyed in 1996 by Tees Archaeology. The front of each enclosure would have contained the main farm building, and behind was a space for growing food or for livestock. Tthere was a trackway between the two rows, running through the settlement. To the west of the tofts, a linear, hollow feature is thought to be a back lane. A large circular depression at the north of the site is interpreted as a pond.

To the west and east of the village there is the ridge and furrow pattern of medieval ploughing, the remains of the open-field system formerly around the village.

See also
 List of lost settlements in the United Kingdom

References

Former populated places in North Yorkshire
Deserted medieval villages in North Yorkshire
Scheduled monuments in North Yorkshire
Middlesbrough